Information gap may refer to:

Information gap task, a technique used in language teaching
Info-gap decision theory, a type of decision theory in economics